The Akaflieg Stuttgart fs16, nicknamed Wippsterz (German: Wagtail) was a glider aircraft that was designed and built in Germany from 1936. Only one example of the design was constructed.

Development
Akaflieg Stuttgart wanted to build a glider with reasonable performance that was safe and simple to fly, the result was the fs16. The design employed a cantilever wing attached to the top of the fuselage; the rear portion of the fuselage was raised, similar to the Akaflieg Stuttgart F.1. The fs16 as constructed had no vertical tail, but used pivoting panels on the wingtips for roll and yaw control. It had no tail-skid, using a single large skid under the front fuselage with a spur extending rearwards for support and stability on the ground. Flight characteristics with the rotating wing-tip panels were not as expected so a conventional vertical fin on an extended rear fuselage, and ailerons constructed from fabric-covered Duralumin on the outer wing trailing edges, were added after initial flights.

Specifications

Similar aircraft
Schleicher Rhönadler

References

Further reading

1930s German sailplanes
Glider aircraft
Aircraft first flown in 1937
Akaflieg Stuttgart aircraft